Przemysław Boldt (born 27 August 1974) is a retired Polish football defender.

References

1974 births
Living people
Polish footballers
Elana Toruń players
Zawisza Bydgoszcz players
Polonia Warsaw players
Ruch Chorzów players
Wisła Płock players
Widzew Łódź players
Polar Wrocław players
Cartusia Kartuzy players
Zdrój Ciechocinek players
Association football defenders
Ekstraklasa players